The Saratov City Duma is the legislative body of Saratov.

Composition

2016

References

Politics of Saratov Oblast
Saratov